Reginald John Berry (1 June 1926 – 16 September 1994), also listed as John James Berry, was an English footballer. Berry joined Manchester United from Birmingham City in 1951. Despite his diminutive stature, he was a natural right winger with technique and pace. One of the Busby Babes, the February 1958 Munich air disaster brought his career to an end.

Personal life
Berry was born in Aldershot in Hampshire, the son of Mary (née O'Connor) and Reginald Berry, a Sergeant in the Royal Horse Artillery; he lived with his family on Crimea Road. As a boy, he played football for St Joseph's School in Aldershot and Aldershot YMCA, and on leaving school he worked as a projectionist for a local cinema. He tried to sign for Aldershot F.C. but was told he was too short. During service with the Royal Artillery in the Second World War, he was brought to the attention of Birmingham City and signed as a professional at St Andrews in 1944.

Injuries sustained in the Munich air disaster brought his footballing career to an end at the age of 31. When he woke up he was totally unaware of the plane crash, his injuries having caused mild amnesia. A month after he regained consciousness, he found out about the crash from seeing a newspaper. He spent two months in hospital with a fractured skull, a broken jaw, a broken elbow, a broken pelvis, and a broken leg. All of his teeth had to be removed while treating his jaw injuries. He only found out which of his teammates had been killed some time after he returned to England. When still in hospital, he would complain to manager Matt Busby that his teammate Tommy Taylor was a poor friend for not visiting him, unaware that Taylor had been killed. Doctors treating Berry felt that he was not well enough to be told that any of his colleagues had died at the time.

Berry died of cancer in a hospice in Farnham in Surrey at the age of 68 in September 1994 after a short illness and was buried in the Catholic section at Aldershot Cemetery. He was the first surviving player of the Munich air disaster to have died.

He was survived by his wife Hilda Doreen née Reeves (1928–2016), whom he married at Aldershot in 1948 and his sons Neil (who was later the head teacher of Brampton Manor School), and twins Paul (born 1952) and Craig Andrew David (1952–1995).

Career 
In 1951, Matt Busby paid Birmingham City £25,000 to bring Berry to Manchester United. Berry played 277 matches for Manchester United, scoring 44 goals along the way, including helping Manchester United win three league titles. He played regularly for the first six seasons, before losing his place in the starting XI to youngster Kenny Morgans.

Berry was also capped four times by England while playing for Manchester United, his chances of regular international action inevitably restricted by the form of Stanley Matthews and Tom Finney on the wing.

His first job after retiring from football was with Massey Ferguson at Trafford Park, but in 1960 he was asked to leave the Manchester United-owned house to accommodate new signing Maurice Setters, and he left the Manchester area to return to Aldershot. He later ran a sports business with his younger brother Peter in Cove, a village near Aldershot, until the 1980s. Peter was also a professional footballer, most notably with Crystal Palace. They also ran the sports shop Berry Brothers at Queensmead in Farnborough. Johnny Berry spent the final years of his working life as a storeman in a local television warehouse.

Depiction in media 
Neil Berry published a book in 2007, The Forgotten Babe, describing his father's years at Manchester United.

Honours
Manchester United
Football League First Division: 1951–52, 1955–56, 1956–57 
FA Charity Shield: 1952, 1956, 1957

References

External links
Profile at StretfordEnd.co.uk
Profile at MUFCInfo.com

1926 births
1994 deaths
Burials in Hampshire
Military personnel from Aldershot
Sportspeople from Aldershot
Royal Artillery personnel
British Army personnel of World War II
English footballers
Association football wingers
Manchester United F.C. players
Birmingham City F.C. players
Survivors of aviation accidents or incidents
England B international footballers
England international footballers
English Football League players
English Football League representative players
Footballers from Hampshire
FA Cup Final players